This article is about the particular significance of the year 1937 to Wales and its people.

Incumbents

Archbishop of Wales – Charles Green, Bishop of Bangor
Archdruid of the National Eisteddfod of Wales – J.J.

Events
3 February – 300,000 people march in South Wales in protest against the Means test.
May – Tywyn businessman and MP Henry Haydn Jones, is knighted.
29 June – The Swansea Improvements and Tramway Company closes its tramway system.
30 June – The Aid to Spain movement welcomes the arrival at Swansea railway station of the first Basque refugee children to come to Wales.
15 July – George VI and Queen Elizabeth visit Aberystwyth to open the new building at the National Library of Wales.
27 August – Saunders Lewis, Lewis Valentine and D. J. Williams are released from Wormwood Scrubs to the plaudits of nationalist supporters, having served a nine-month sentence for the arson attack on the Penrhos "bombing school".
November – A strike over safety concerns at the Ocean Coal Company's collieries originates at Risca.
The South Wales Regional Council of Labour is formed.
The parabolic arched church of Our Lady Star of the Sea and St Winefride, Amlwch, designed by Giuseppe Rinvolucri, is completed and consecrated.
The Urdd launches the first Welsh books campaign.

Arts and literature
Summer - Literary magazine Wales first published, edited by Keidrych Rhys.
James Gomer Berry becomes chairman of Kemsley Newspapers Ltd.
The Prose Medal is awarded for the first time at the National Eisteddfod.

Awards

National Eisteddfod of Wales (held in Machynlleth)
National Eisteddfod of Wales: Chair – T. Rowland Hughes
National Eisteddfod of Wales: Crown – J. M. Edwards
National Eisteddfod of Wales: Prose Medal – J. O. Williams

New books
Ambrose Bebb – Y Ddeddf Uno 1536
David Jones – In Parenthesis
Lewis Jones - Cwmardy
Eiluned Lewis & Peter Lewis - The Land of Wales
T. J. Morgan - Dal Llygoden Ac Ysgrifau Eraill
John Cowper Powys - Morwyn: or The Vengeance of God
Ernest Rhys – Song of the Sun
Louie Myfanwy Thomas writing as Jane Ann Jones – Storïau Hen Ferch

Music
Ivor Novello – Crest of the Wave (musical)
Colin Ross – Ostinato

Film
Ray Milland appears in five new films, including Ebb Tide.

Broadcasting
1 February – A new transmitter is opened at Penmon, Anglesey, to bring the West and Wales BBC Regional Programme to North Wales.
4 July – Following the alteration of frequencies at the BBC's Washford transmitting station to enable it to radiate separate regional services for South Wales and the West of England, the new Welsh Regional Programme begins, broadcast from Washford (across the Bristol Channel) on 1050 kHz and Penmon on 804 kHz.
Radio programmes include: The Fascination of Brechfa, presented by G. Arbour Stevens

Sport
Billiards - Horace Coles wins the World Amateur Billiards Championship.
Boxing
15 March - Tommy Farr wins the British and Commonwealth heavyweight titles.
30 August - Farr loses on points to Joe Louis.

Births
8 January – Shirley Bassey, singer
22 January – Ryan Davies, entertainer (died 1977)
24 January – Trevor Edwards, footballer
18 February – Donald Braithwaite, boxer
13 March – Martin Thomas, Baron Thomas of Gresford, politician
21 March – Ann Clwyd, politician
22 April – Julian Cayo-Evans, political activist (died 1995)
26 April – Gareth Gwenlan, television producer (died 2016)
27 May – Danny Harris, rugby player
8 June
Gillian Clarke, poet
John Williams, snooker referee
14 August – Brian Curvis, welterweight boxer (died 2012)
7 September – Clive Everton, snooker commentator
14 September – Fenton Coles, rugby player
30 September – Gary Hocking, motorcycle road racer (died 1962)
5 October – Iwan Edwards, choral conductor (in Canada) (died 2022)
6 October – David Morgan, cricket administrator
19 October – Terence Thomas, banker (died 2018 in England)
30 October – Brian Price, rugby player
8 December – Malcolm Price, rugby player
30 December – Saunders Davies, Anglican bishop
31 December – Sir Anthony Hopkins, actor
date unknown
Trebor Edwards, tenor
Prys Morgan, historian

Deaths
15 January – Arthur Cheetham, pioneering film maker, 72
2 February – Hugh Ingledew, Wales international rugby player, 71
April – Jack Doughty, footballer, 71
21 April – Kenneth Morris, Theosophist writer, 57
28 April – Frederick Guest, politician, 61
15 May – George Thomson, footballer, 82
18 May – Idwal Jones, schoolmaster, poet and dramatist, 41
20 May – Walter Davis, footballer, 48 (drowned)
5 June – Owen Cosby Philipps, 1st Baron Kylsant, shipping magnate, 74
26 June – Jackie Beynon, footballer (peritonitis)
22 July – Alfred George Edwards, former Archbishop of Wales, 88
2 October – Swansea Jack, retriever, 7
22 October – William Penfro Rowlands, hymn-writer, 77
23 October – Stephen Thomas, Wales international rugby player, 72
1 November – William Alexander, Wales international rugby player, 63
25 November – David Lewis Davies, politician, 64
26 December – Dan Beddoe, popular singer, 74

See also
1937 in Northern Ireland

References

 
Wales
 Wales